Manahan may refer to:

Aeon Manahan, British songwriter, music producer and performer
Anastasia Manahan or Anna Anderson (1896–1984), impostor who claimed to be Grand Duchess Anastasia of Russia
Anna Manahan (1924–2009), Irish stage, film and television actress
Anthony Manahan (1794–1849), businessman and political figure in Upper Canada
Cliff Manahan (1888–1970), Canadian curler from Edmonton, Alberta
Denise Manahan-Vaughan, Dean of Studies and Director of the International Graduate School of Neuroscience at the Ruhr University Bochum
Donal T. Manahan (born 1953), Irish-born American marine scientist and comparative physiologist
Elin Manahan Thomas, British soprano, best known as a performer of Baroque music
James Manahan (1866–1932), U.S. Representative from Minnesota
Janelle Manahan or Janelle Quintana (born 1989), actress in the Philippines
Joey Manahan (born 1971), Filipino American politician
Larry Manahan, former member of the Ohio House of Representatives, serving from 1977 to 1992
Manuel Manahan (1916–1994), Filipino statesman, journalist, businessman, and rural development advocate
Michael Manahan (died 2000), Irish civil servant within the Department of Industry and Commerce
Robert L. Manahan (1956–2000), American actor
Ronald E. Manahan, president of Grace College and Theological Seminary
Sheila Manahan (1924–1988), Irish actress

See also
Manahan Peak, east of Giggenbach Ridge in northeast Ross Island
Manahan Stadium, multi-purpose stadium in Surakarta, Indonesia
Hanahan (disambiguation)
Manahen
Manmohan
Monahan